Union County School District can refer to:
Union County School District (Florida)
Union County School District (Georgia)
Union County School District (Mississippi)
Union County Schools (South Carolina)